Tapan Kumar Sarkar (August 2, 1948 – March 12, 2021) was an Indian-American electrical engineer and Professor Emeritus at the Department of Electrical Engineering and Computer Science at Syracuse University. He was best known for his contributions to computational electromagnetics and antenna theory.

Sarkar was the recipient of IEEE Electromagnetics Award in 2020.

Biography
Sarkar was born on August 2, 1948, in Kolkata, India. He obtained his Bachelor of Technology from IIT Kharagpur and Master of Engineering from University of New Brunswick in 1969 and 1971, respectively. He received his Master of Science and Doctor of Philosophy degrees from Syracuse University in 1975.

Between 1975 and 1976, Sarkar worked for TACO Division of General Instrument. Between 1976 and 1985, he was a faculty member at Rochester Institute of Technology; he also briefly held a research fellowship position at Gordon McKay Laboratory for Applied Sciences in Harvard University in between 1977 and 1978. In 1985, he became a professor at Syracuse University and held the position until his death. He died on March 12, 2021, in Syracuse, New York.

Sarkar acted as an associate editor for the IEEE Transactions on Electromagnetic Compatibility in between 1986-1989 and for IEEE Transactions on Antennas and Propagation in between 2004 and 2010. He was the 2014 president of IEEE Antennas & Propagation Society and the vice president of the Applied Computational Electromagnetics Society (ACES). Sarkar also served as board member for journals such as Digital Signal Processing, Journal of Electromagnetic Waves and Applications and Microwave and Optical Technology Letters.

Sarkar was the president of OHRN Enterprises, Inc., an incorporated business specializing in computer services and system analysis.

Research and awards
Sarkar's research interests focused on "numerical solutions of operator equations arising in electromagnetics and signal processing with application to system design." He is the author or co-author of more than 380 journal articles, as well as 16 books and, 32 book chapters. Along with his doctoral student Yingbo Hua, he developed the generalized pencil-of-function method for signal estimation with complex exponentials. Based on Sarkar's past work on the original pencil-of-function method, the technique is used in electromagnetic analyses of layered structures, antenna analysis and radar signal processing. He is also the co-author of the general purpose electromagnetic solver, HOBBIES.

In 2010, Sarkar was chosen as the IEEE Distinguished Lecturer in Antennas and Propagation Systems. In 2020, he received IEEE Electromagnetics Award "for contributions to the efficient and accurate solution of computational electromagnetic problems in frequency and time domain, and for research in adaptive antennas." He previously was the recipient of Best Paper Awards of the IEEE Transactions on Electromagnetic Compatibility in 1979 and National Radar Conference in the 1997.

Sarkar received honorary doctorate degrees from Blaise Pascal University, Technical University of Madrid and Aalto University, respectively in 1998, 2004 and 2012.

Selected publications
Journal articles
 

 
 
 
 
 

Books

References

External links

1948 births
2021 deaths
People from Kolkata
Indian emigrants to the United States
American electrical engineers
Indian electrical engineers
American telecommunications engineers
Microwave engineers
Electrical engineering academics
IIT Kharagpur alumni
University of New Brunswick alumni
Syracuse University College of Engineering and Computer Science alumni
Rochester Institute of Technology faculty
Syracuse University faculty
People from Syracuse, New York
American engineering writers
20th-century Indian non-fiction writers
21st-century Indian non-fiction writers
20th-century Indian engineers
21st-century Indian engineers
20th-century American non-fiction writers
21st-century American non-fiction writers
20th-century American engineers
21st-century American engineers
Fellow Members of the IEEE
American textbook writers
Indian textbook writers